Mount Vernon Senior High School is a public high school in Mount Vernon, Indiana and is part of the M.S.D. of Mount Vernon.

About
The current campus was completed in 1960 and was expanded in the 1980s.  It serves high school students from 4 townships (Black, Lynn, Marrs & Point) in the southern half of Posey County.

Athletics

Teams
Mount Vernon's athletic teams are nicknamed the Wildcats and the school's colors are Maroon and Gray.  The Wildcats compete in the Pocket Athletic Conference (Indiana) in the following sports:  baseball, boys and girls basketball, boys and girls cross country, football, golf, boys and girls soccer, softball, boys and girls swimming, boys and girls tennis, track and field, volleyball, and wrestling.

See also
 List of high schools in Indiana

References

External links
 Indiana Department of Education: School Snapshot
Metropolitan School District of Mount Vernon
 IHSAA Website
 
 

Public high schools in Indiana
Southwestern Indiana
Pocket Athletic Conference
Big Eight Conference (IHSAA)
Former Southern Indiana Athletic Conference members
Schools in Posey County, Indiana
Mount Vernon, Indiana
High schools in Southwestern Indiana
1870 establishments in Indiana